Qabtan is a village in northern Aleppo Governorate, northwestern Syria.

Administratively the village belongs to Nahiya Akhtarin in Azaz District. Nearby localities include Turkman Bareh  to the northwest, and Ziadiyah  to the north. In the 2004 census, Qabtan had a population of 846.

References

Villages in Aleppo Governorate
Populated places in Azaz District